Granatin A is an ellagitannin found in the pericarp of Punica granatum (pomegranate). It is a weak carbonic anhydrase inhibitor.

References

External links 
 Granatin A at the Human Metabolome Database

Pomegranate ellagitannins